Ijaw Youth Council (also indefinite as "Ijaw youths") is a civil rights organization in Nigeria, founded in 1998, which supports the interests of the Ijaw ethnic group of the Niger Delta.   At the point of the establishment of the IYC, leadership of the organization spread across the Nigerian states where the Ijaw people resides. Hence,  in the South-South Nigeria (also known as Niger-Delta), Pronto Douglass led the IYC while Pere Camfo was the leader of the IYC in Ondo State  From 2001 to 2004, it was headed by Mujahid Dokubo-Asari, until Asari split from the movement to found the Niger Delta People's Volunteer Force.

Mr Peter Igbifa is the current President of the organization.

The Egbesu Boys, a group of Ijaw youths, which started as both cultural and religious groups but turned out as a group of young folks, which rise to tackle injustice resulting from oil exploitation in the Niger Delta  have been identified as the militant arm of the IYC.

External links
The Kaima Declaration by Ijaw Youths of the Niger Delta: "Being communique issued at the end of the All-Ijaw Youths Conference which held in the town of Kaima this 11th day of December 1998"

References

Rebel groups in Nigeria
Ijaw
National liberation movements
Petroleum politics
Youth organizations based in Nigeria